The 2022 Bengaluru Open II was a professional tennis tournament played on hard courts. It was the fifth edition of the tournament which was part of the 2022 ATP Challenger Tour. It took place in Bangalore, India from 14 to 20 February 2022.

Singles main-draw entrants

Seeds

 1 Rankings are as of 7 February 2022.

Other entrants
The following players received wildcards into the singles main draw:
  Arjun Kadhe
  Adil Kalyanpur
  Sidharth Rawat

The following players received entry from the qualifying draw:
  Antoine Bellier
  Andrew Harris
  Markos Kalovelonis
  Dominik Palán
  Mukund Sasikumar
  Nitin Kumar Sinha

Champions

Singles

  Aleksandar Vukic def.  Dimitar Kuzmanov 6–4, 6–4.

Doubles

  Alexander Erler /  Arjun Kadhe def.  Saketh Myneni /  Ramkumar Ramanathan 6–3, 6–7(4–7), [10–7].

References

2022 ATP Challenger Tour
2022
2022 in Indian tennis
February 2022 sports events in India